The Ecology School is a non-profit environmental education program started in 1998 in Saco, Maine.

The Ecology School, located in Saco, Maine, is an innovative school for students of all ages to learn by their natural inclinations—engaging all five senses to discover the inner workings of the world around them. Through hands-on, experiential programming students learn to become stewards of the environment as they explore local forests, coastal ecosystems, and food systems. In everything they do—leading single-day and residential programs; teaching outreach programs at schools; running camps; and publishing original curriculum and field guides—The Ecology School accentuates the magic, mystery, and wonder of nature so students can better understand and care for the environment. The Ecology School has hosted more than 185,000 students and teachers from across Maine and New England since its inception in 1998.

Staff also travel to regional and national conferences and summits, presenting original workshops and training on everything from food systems education and sustainability to innovative teaching methodology. The Ecology School also published its own curriculum for educators and an ecosystem-based field guide in 2002.

In 2019 The Ecology School will transition to a new home at River Bend Farm, a historic 105-acre farm located on a scenic bend in the Saco River. The move will propel educational initiatives by increasing program capacity and providing “live what you learn” opportunities for participants through hands-on exploration of Maine's ecosystems, sustainable living practices, direct connection to food systems and farming along with modelling conservation-in-action. A 7,000 square-foot dining commons and a 9,000 square-foot dormitory to be constructed on the River Bend Farm property will meet the most advanced measures of sustainability in the built environment through certifications with the Living Building Challenge. The Living Building Challenge aims to create buildings that generate more energy than they use, capture and treat all water on site, and are made using healthy materials.

References

External links 
 The Ecology School

Education in Maine
Environmental education in the United States
Nature centers in Maine
Buildings and structures in Saco, Maine
Educational institutions established in 1998